The 2018 Karnataka State Film Awards, presented by Government of Karnataka, felicitated the best of Karnataka cinema released in the year 2018. The Awards are given away on 24 April every year which is the birthday of Dr. Rajkumar. But due to the Lok Sabha and Assembly elections in the last two years, the awards were not given on this day. The list of winners were announced on 10 January 2020.

Lifetime achievement award

Film Awards

Other Awards

References

External links

2018
2018 Indian film awards